Bastien Coriton (born 12 September 1981) is a French politician who briefly served as a Member of Parliament in 2020.

Career 
As the substitute candidate in the 2017 legislative election, he took the seat of Christophe Bouillon.

He was elected mayor of Rives-en-Seine and, due to the dual mandate, resigned from the National Assembly after 5 days, triggering a by-election.

References 

Living people
1981 births
People from Seine-Maritime
Deputies of the 15th National Assembly of the French Fifth Republic
Socialist Party (France) politicians

Mayors of places in Normandy